La Motte-de-Galaure is a former commune in the Drôme department in southeastern France. On 1 January 2022, it was merged into the new commune of Saint-Jean-de-Galaure.

Geography
The Galaure flows southwest through the southern part of the commune.

Population

See also
Communes of the Drôme department

References

Former communes of Drôme